Kaklıktaşı is a village in Tarsus district of Mersin Province, Turkey. It is situated in the Taurus Mountains. The population of Belen was 351  as of 2012. The area around Kaklıktaşı was populated in the Roman Empire era of the 2nd and 3rd centuries. But the village was founded during the Ottoman period. Main economic activities are agriculture animal breeding and poultry husbandry.

References

Villages in Tarsus District